The banded leaf-toed gecko (Hemidactylus fasciatus) is a species of gecko. It is endemic to West Africa west of the Dahomey Gap, from southern Guinea to Togo.

Hemidactylus fasciatus is a fairly large gecko recognizable by the broad dark band between the eyes and the neck and by its pale upper lip. It is generally found in the forest where it hides during the day in tree stumps or rock crevices.

References

Hemidactylus
Geckos of Africa
Reptiles of West Africa
Fauna of Ghana
Fauna of Ivory Coast
Fauna of Liberia
Fauna of Sierra Leone
Fauna of Togo
Reptiles described in 1842
Taxa named by John Edward Gray